Neomelanesthes is a genus of moths in the family Cosmopterigidae.

Species
Neomelanesthes atopa (Bradley, 1959)
Neomelanesthes disema (Diakonoff, 1954)

Etymology
The genus name refers to the preexisting genus name Melanesthes in the family Tenebrionidae (Coleoptera).

References

 , 2008: Replacement names for some preoccupied Macro- and Microlepidopteran genera (Lepidoptera). Munis Entomology & Zoology 3 (1): 185-190. Full article: .

Cosmopterigidae